Givira anna, the anna carpenterworm moth, is a moth in the family Cossidae. It is found in North America, where it has been recorded from Alabama, Arkansas, Florida, Georgia, Indiana, Kansas, Kentucky, Louisiana, Maryland, Mississippi, North Carolina, Oklahoma, South Carolina, Tennessee and Texas.

The wingspan is 25–36 mm. Adults have been recorded on wing from March to August.

References

Natural History Museum Lepidoptera generic names catalog

Givira
Moths described in 1898